Firuz Kandeh may refer to:
 Firuz Kandeh-ye Olya
 Firuz Kandeh-ye Sofla